William Andrew Swanson (October 12, 1888 – October 14, 1954) was an infielder in Major League Baseball. He was born in New York, New York.

Swanson played briefly for the  Boston Red Sox as a reserve infielder for Steve Yerkes (2B), Larry Gardner (3B) and Everett Scott (SS). He went 4-for-20 for a .200 batting average in 11 games, including two doubles and a .304 on-base percentage, and never appeared in a major league game again.

Swanson died in his hometown of New York, just two days after his 66th birthday.

External links
Baseball Reference
Retrosheet

Boston Red Sox players
Major League Baseball infielders
Baseball players from New York (state)
1888 births
1954 deaths
Burials at Calvary Cemetery (Queens)
Utica Utes players